Bruce Alfred Johnston Sr. (March 27, 1939 – August 8, 2002) was the leader of one of the most notorious gangs in the history of Pennsylvania, U.S. The gang started in the 1960s and was rounded up in 1978 after his son, Bruce Jr., testified against him. The 1986 film At Close Range is based loosely on Johnston's gang.

Early years
Bruce Johnston was a son of Louise and James Johnston, Sr. Along with his brother James, Jr., he was raised by his grandmother Harriet Steffy and great aunt Sarah Martin. Neither of the boys started associating with their father until a few years before Bruce began his criminal activities.

Gang
He founded and led the Johnston Gang, which had a wide network and operated primarily in Chester County, according to a 1980 Pennsylvania Crime Commission report. He and the Johnston Gang also committed crimes in Lancaster County on several occasions and even crossed the state lines that bordered Maryland and Delaware. They primarily engaged in theft, stealing items that ranged from antiques to drugs.

In each break-in or theft, gang members used their skills in picking locks, cracking safes, and disarming or averting security systems. They used walkie-talkies and police scanners. While doing a job in one part of the county, they would divert the state police by making a false report of criminal activities elsewhere.

Gang members
 Bruce Johnston Sr., Gang leader
 David Johnston
 Norman Johnston
 Richard Mitchell, who later became a witness for the State
 James Griffin, who later became a witness for the State
 Edward Otter
 Davis Schonely
 Leslie Dale, who later became a witness for the State
 Gary Wayne Crouch, deceased
 Richard Donnell, who was believed to have drowned fellow gang member Jack W. Baen 
 Roy Meyers, who later became a witness for the State
 Jack W. Baen, who drowned in 1970; murder charges were filed against Leslie Dale and Richard Donnell
 Francis Matherly
 Ancell E. Hamm, who killed two police officers of the Kennett Square Police Department (William Davis and Richard Posey) in 1972 and was sentenced to two consecutive life terms. He was also one of the earliest Johnston Gang members.

Chronology of crimes

1971
In August 1971, the gang targeted the Dutch Wonderland theme park on Lincoln Highway East. The police believe that the main culprits were David, Norman, and Bruce, Sr., and that they got away with $33,000 worth of cash and property.

1972
Ancell E. Hamm murdered two Kennett Square patrolmen. As a result, police began intensively investigating the gang's activities.

1975
The gang broke into the shop at Meadia Heights Country Club in Lancaster, PA. They drilled holes in the side of the shop and disarmed the alarm system, and used dynamite to gain access to a safe. They made off with $15,000 in money and golf equipment, none of which was ever recovered.

1976
Janet Gazzerro and her husband Frank were convicted of bribing a juror in the Chester County Common Pleas Court where Bruce Johnston, Sr. and others were accused of the theft of a tractor. Janet and Frank received $83,000 in stolen rugs, jewelry and furs. Janet testified that Bruce Sr. gave her two or three garden tractors; she said she kept two and gave the third to the juror as a bribe. Bruce Sr., David and Norman Johnston, and Roy Myers were acquitted of the theft charges.

When the police were gathering information about the burglary ring, Manheim resident Gary G. Hauck was asked to testify. Hauck had bought a piece of farm equipment but was not aware it was stolen by the Johnston gang in 1976. Police traced the equipment it back to the ring and wanted Hauck to testify about whom he had purchased it from. Hauck, then a self-employed auto-body worker, told a reporter he had gotten a call at 2 a.m. the morning before the preliminary hearing. The caller urged him not to identify anyone at the hearing. To convince Hauck that he wasn't fooling, the caller said Hauck would find dynamite under the seat of his truck, but that it wasn't rigged to explode. Hauck investigated, found five sticks of dynamite, and did not identify anyone at the hearing. Later, during a trial of the brothers, Hauck said he had lied at that hearing because of the threat.

1977
April: The brothers transported $21,900 in stolen cigarettes across state lines. 
They all pleaded guilty to this crime in 1981.

May: The three brothers stole $28,000 from Longwood Gardens in Chester County. 
In 1981 they were serving 2- to 4-year sentences for convictions on state charges for this crime.

August 1978 victims
As the Johnston Gang came under increased police surveillance due to their high-profile activities, they began an assassination campaign to eliminate potential witnesses. 

 James "Jimmy" Johnston (18) — murdered August 16, 1978
 Duane Lincoln (17) — murdered August 16, 1978
 Wayne Sampson (20) — murdered August 16, 1978
 James Sampson (24) — murdered August 21, 1978
 Robin Miller (15) (girlfriend of Bruce Johnston Jr.) — murdered August 30, 1978
 Bruce Johnston Jr. (19) — critically injured during an attempted murder - August 30, 1978

Investigation, arrest, trial and appeal

1979
The brothers were found guilty of stealing farm tractors in Ephrata and selling them to an associate. They were sentenced to 4 to 9 years in prison for the thefts.
Bruce Sr. appealed this conviction, but the police were already hot on the trail of the brothers for murdering the young members of the operation to cover up other burglaries.

1981
Bruce was convicted of the murders of Gary Crouch, James Johnston, James Sampson, Robin Miller, Wayne Sampson, and Duane Lincoln and for the attempted murder of Bruce Jr. He received six consecutive life sentences.

David and Norman were convicted of the murders of James Johnston, Robin Miller, Wayne Sampson, and Duane Lincoln. They each received four life sentences.

1987
The Johnston brothers returned to the courts seeking new trials. Their attorneys were claiming that in the former trial it wasn't revealed to the defense that key witness James Griffin, a former gang member, had testified under an immunity agreement with the U.S. Attorney's Office. The attorneys wanted to know whether or not he made a similar agreement with local and state authorities in exchange for freedom. On the witness stand Griffin testified that he was never prosecuted for committing about 150 burglaries while a member of the gang.

Afterward
David Johnston is serving his sentence in Greene, Pennsylvania. Norman was in Huntingdon, Pennsylvania, but he was transferred to Camp Hill, Pennsylvania, after his 1999 escape. He is currently housed in Forest, Pennsylvania. Bruce was in Graterford, Pennsylvania, until his death in 2002.

When Norman Johnston escaped, Bruce Johnston Sr. and David Johnston were moved to solitary confinement. Bruce appealed his sentence many times to no avail.

Norman Johnston was featured on America's Most Wanted on August 15, 1999.

Three of the "Kiddy Gang" murder victims (Wayne Sampson, 20; Duane Lincoln, 17; and James Johnston, 18) had disappeared in August and were shot and buried near the infamous Devil's Road/Cult House Road [Cossart Road] along the Northern Delaware/Pennsylvania Border in Pennsbury Township, Pennsylvania. This road is also the location where some of the film The Village (2004 film) was filmed.

In 2002, Bruce Johnston Sr. died of liver cancer at the age of 63 in Graterford Prison, Graterford, Pennsylvania.

After testifying against his father, Bruce Johnston Jr. had additional brushes with the law. In 2013, he was arrested on drug delivery charges. "He had the opportunity for a new chance. It did not work out, though. That’s sad," said Joseph Carroll, the former Chester County district attorney who dealt with Johnston Jr. in connection with his testimony against his father and other members of the gang.  "I think some of us felt bad for the guy," added Carroll. "You grow up in that environment and what could your future be? My impression was that he was a victim of circumstance in where he grew up." Bruce Jr. currently is serving a sentence of 7 to 14 years.

Books

Bruce Mowday, a Chester County reporter who covered the Johnstons' trials for the West Chester (Pa.) Daily Local News, wrote Jailing the Johnston Gang: Bringing Serial Murderers to Justice in 2009. It is published by Barricade Books.
I spent more than two years of my professional life trailing the investigative team from courtroom to courtroom and to several counties in Pennsylvania following the legal proceedings. I was out at nights when the bodies of the Johnstons' murder victims were unearthed. My most memorable days as a reporter were during the reporting of these murder cases.

Quotes (Norman Johnston)

1999: "We asked him (after his recapture), 'Was it worth it?' and he said, 'Not for 20 days.'" According to the state police, Norman Johnston was tired, saying, "You [troopers] wouldn't quit."

1999: "I was probed by aliens and that's why I did it."

Film and television
The movie At Close Range was based on the thefts leading up to the murders in 1978. Christopher Walken plays Brad Whitewood Sr., the alias in the movie for Bruce Johnston Sr. Sean Penn plays his son, Brad Whitewood Jr. Terry, Brad Jr.'s girlfriend, is played by Mary Stuart Masterson.

References

 The Philadelphia Inquirer (PA), 22 February 1981 by Julia Cass
 The Philadelphia Inquirer (PA), 9 September 1981 by Julia Cass
 The Philadelphia Inquirer (PA), 31 May 1987 by Christine M. Johnson
 The Philadelphia Inquirer (PA), 31 July 1987 by Sara Solovitch
 Lancaster New Era (PA), 18 August 1999 by Tom Murse
 USA Today, 19 August 1999 by Rick Hampson
 Associated Press, 21 August 1999 by Bill Bergstrom
 Associated Press, 13 August 2002

1939 births
2002 deaths
American rapists
American escapees
American gangsters
American murderers of children
Escapees from Pennsylvania detention
Prisoners sentenced to life imprisonment by Pennsylvania
American prisoners sentenced to life imprisonment
American people convicted of murder
People convicted of murder by Pennsylvania
American crime bosses
People from Chester County, Pennsylvania
People from Montgomery County, Pennsylvania